WKYD-LP (95.5 FM) was a radio station licensed to Jamestown, Kentucky, United States. The station was owned by the Southern Kentucky Weather Bureau Inc. At the end of 2016, WKYD-LP was taken silent. Its license expired August 1, 2020.

References

KYD-LP
KYD-LP
Radio stations established in 2005
2005 establishments in Kentucky
Defunct radio stations in the United States
Radio stations disestablished in 2020
2020 disestablishments in Kentucky
KYD-LP
NOAA Weather Radio
Jamestown, Kentucky